"A Little More Love" is a song recorded by British-Australian singer Olivia Newton-John for her tenth studio album, Totally Hot (1978). Written and produced by Newton-John's long-time record producer John Farrar, the song was released as the lead single from Totally Hot in October 1978 and became a worldwide hit single.

In the United States, "A Little More Love" reached its peak position of number three on the Billboard Hot 100 in February 1979, and peaked at number four on the Adult Contemporary chart. In Canada, it spent three weeks at position number two on the RPM Top Singles chart during February and March 1979, and was the seventh biggest hit of that year. It also reached number five on the RPM Adult Contemporary chart. In the United Kingdom, the song reached number 4, and stayed on the charts for 12 weeks.

Record World said the song is "more rock-oriented than [Newton-John's] past pop efforts, and with a song as good as this one, the transition should be a pleasing one."

Billboard magazine ranked "A Little More Love" as the 17th most popular song of 1979, and Cash Box magazine ranked it as 23rd for the year, where it had peaked at number four in March 1979.

Charts

Weekly charts

Year-end charts

References 

1978 songs
1979 singles
Olivia Newton-John songs
Songs written by John Farrar
Song recordings produced by John Farrar
MCA Records singles
EMI Records singles